Creatures is an artificial life simulation packaged as a video game developed by British studio Creature Labs for Windows, and was ported to Macintosh, PlayStation, and Game Boy Advance. It is the first game in the Creatures series.

Gameplay
Creatures is a game which allows the player to hatch and then raise anthropomorphic beings known as Norns.

Notably, the environment was actually a physically constructed model, carefully photographed. This was to keep graphics costs low.

Creatures is an artificial life simulation where the user hatches small furry animals and teaches them how to behave, or leaves them to learn on their own. These "Norns" can talk, feed themselves, and protect themselves against vicious creatures called Grendels. It was the first popular application of machine learning in an interactive simulation. Neural networks are used by the creatures to learn what to do. The game is regarded as a breakthrough in artificial life research, which aims to model the behavior of creatures interacting with their environment.

According to Millennium, every copy of Creatures contains a unique starting set of eggs, whose genomes are not replicated on any other copy of the game. An expansion pack, called "Life Kit #1" was released for purchase later.

Development
The game was in development for four years.

Reception

The PlayStation version received "unfavorable" reviews according to the review aggregation website Metacritic. However, Next Generation said that the PC version "offers one of the most obsessive and entertaining experiences anyone can have in front of the computer." The Electric Playground gave the same PC version universal acclaim, over a month before it was released Stateside.

The PC version sold 100,000 units by November 1997. At the time, John Moore of Mindscape explained that the company "expect[s] to sell more than 200,000 Creatures by the end of the year." Global sales of the game neared 400,000 units by February 1998.

Legacy
The model built during development and photographed as the game's backdrop, is held at The Centre for Computing History, where it is on permanent display.

References

External links
 

1996 video games
Classic Mac OS games
Conspiracy Entertainment games
Creatures (video game series)
Game Boy Advance games
Mindscape games
PlayStation (console) games
Swing! Entertainment games
Video games developed in the United Kingdom
Windows games